Nuits Blanches is the second studio album by Clara Morgane, released on 29 November 2010. Its best ranking regarding sales in France has been 108th so far.

Track listing

Credits
Words: Clara Morgane

Singles
Le Diable au Corps (2010)
Le Diable au Corps - 3'45
Il (2011)
Il - 3"34
Il (Didarclub Remix By Jey Didarko) - 3"38
Il (Remix Hakimhakli)- 3"40
Good Time (2011)

References 

2010 albums
Clara Morgane albums